Ordrup station is a commuter rail station serving the suburb of Ordrup north of Copenhagen, Denmark. 
It is located on the Klampenborg radial of Copenhagen's S-train network and is served by the C-line, and in exceptional circumstances by the F-line to Hellerup.

History
The station opened in 1924 on the Klampenborg Line which opened in 1863.

Architecture
The main station building was designed by the Danish architect K.T. Seest in Neoclassical style. The station was listed in 1992. The station was renovated by Gottlieb Paludan Architects in 2014.

See also
List of railway stations in Denmark

References

S-train (Copenhagen) stations
Listed railway stations in Copenhagen
Knud Tanggaard Seest railway stations
Railway stations opened in 1924
1924 establishments in Denmark
Railway stations in Denmark opened in the 20th century